King's Academy (Arabic Translation: "كينغز أكاديمي") is an independent, co-educational boarding and day school for students in grades 7 to 12 in Madaba-Manja, Jordan. It is named in honor of King Abdullah II of Jordan and seeks to fulfill His Majesty's vision of producing "a new generation of enlightened and creative minds." King Abdullah attended high school at Deerfield Academy in the United States as there was no school of comparable standing in Jordan when he was a boy, but his son Crown Prince Hussein enrolled in the new school's second incoming class (2008). The school's first headmaster, Dr. Eric Widmer, was a past headmaster of Deerfield.

The primary language of instruction at King's Academy is English. Both Arabic-speaking and non-Arabic-speaking students are required to study Arabic. The academy is a member of the G30 Schools group.

Location and campus
The King's Academy campus was designed by an Egyptian architect and Director of the Prince's School of Traditional Arts in London Khaled Azzam. The campus and buildings are constructed on a 575-dunum (144-acre) site and comprise some 35 major buildings.

Athletic facilities
The athletic facilities include a semi-Olympic swimming pool, tennis court, squash court, handball and basketball courts, and cardio and weight training facilities. There is also an outdoor sports stadium that includes a full-size football field, two additional football fields, and a track.

King Abdullah II Spiritual Center
The King Abdullah II Spiritual Center is a multi-faith spiritual center that is available for use to all members of the school community, regardless of their faith. Both the indoor prayer room and the open-air courtyard are available for use at all times by students, faculty, staff and campus visitors.

The Abdul Majeed Shoman Auditorium
The Abdul Majeed Shoman Auditorium holds 700 people and is the location of both school and community events including concerts, student recitals, plays and dance performances. Students and faculty members gather here for weekly school meetings.

The Sheikh Jabir Al-Ahmad Al-Sabah Building
The building has a total area of 2,200 square meters and houses the Middle School, the Office of the Headmaster, and the Office of Admissions.
The Middle School comprises 10 classrooms, two fully equipped science labs, an art wing, a study lounge and a large multipurpose room, in addition to the dean's office and the school counselor's office. The building is fully accessible with an elevator and additional ramps.

The HRH Sheikh Mohammed Bin Rashid Al Maktoum Library
For use by students, faculty, staff and guests of King's Academy, the HRH Sheikh Mohammed Bin Rashid Al Maktoum Library holds 50,000 volumes. The building is outfitted with wireless internet, reading tables and study spaces, including a circular reading room (a rotunda) that overlooks the campus.

Student body
The King's Academy campus was built to accommodate both day and boarding students, the latter comprising about 70 percent of the student body.

For the 2022-2023 academic year, 570 students were enrolled at the school, representing some 40 countries in the Middle East and around the world. Of these students, 45 percent are female and 55 percent are male.

Approximately 43% of students receive financial aid.

Academics
The school's curriculum is based on the American Advanced Placement (AP) program, and the Middle School curriculum is based on the College Board’s QUEST framework for teaching and learning. Students intending to attend a Jordanian university or gain certain professional licenses in Jordan can obtain a certificate of Tawjihi equivalency in lieu of taking the national Tawjihi examination. The primary language of instruction at King's Academy is English, but the study of Arabic is required of all students throughout their years at King's.

King's Academy is accredited by the New England Association of Schools and Colleges (NEASC). It is a founding member of Global Online Academy (GOA), a member of the G30 Schools group, and is a Round Square school.

References

External links

 King's Academy Website
 Arabic Year at King's Academy Website
 Monarch lays cornerstone for King's Academy boarding school Jordan Times, July 23, 2004

International schools in Jordan
Boarding schools in Jordan
Private schools in Jordan
High schools and secondary schools in Jordan
Educational institutions established in 2007
Gifted education
2007 establishments in Jordan
Bahrain–Jordan relations
Round Square schools
Jordan